The Garfield School is a former schoolhouse near downtown Salem, Oregon. It stands on the corner of Marion and Cottage streets. After a mid-70s renovation, it now serves as offices for businesses and the state. It has three floors and an attic converted to meeting spaces. It is listed on the National Register of Historic Places.

History 
The building was designed by local architect Fred A. Legg, and was built in 1909. The architect, Legg, received five percent of the construction costs. This was the first school Legg designed in the region, but he would go on to design more schools for Salem and surrounding cities as far north as Camas, Washington.

The land the school is on was bought by the School Board in 1908 for $4,750. A bond measure was passed for Garfield School in March 1909, and construction was completed in October 1909.

The building was made with brick, due to concern over the possibility of fire in the old schoolhouse, which was made of wood. 
It closed in 1973, but was bought a year later and renovated.
The Garfield School was added to the National Register of Historic Places in December 1981

Use as a School 
When this building was constructed, six other schools existed in Salem. The building is the first brick public elementary school in Salem. Two days before the March 1909 bond measure, fire threatened the lives of 550 students at another East Salem school.
The first principal was Margaret J. Cosper. She believed heavily in discipline. She was known for playing martial music on her Victrola Gramophone while students marched out of classes at noon and the end of the day. She ensured students had access to art, placing photographs of well-known art in the halls of the school, and placing three Italian statues on display.
The original floor plan had four major classrooms (one in each corner of the building) on both floors, with small rooms in-between.
The Garfield School closed in 1973.

Renovation and Use as Office Space
Adaptive-use renovation work took place in this building to turn it into office space in 1974, more renovation took place in 1979. This had minimal effect on the inside of the building and instead focused on making the space leasable to offices. To match code, an elevator was added. 
The playground was turned into a parking lot during the renovation.  There are two notable murals inside the building reflect the history of the school.

References

Buildings and structures in Salem, Oregon
National Register of Historic Places in Salem, Oregon
Defunct schools in Oregon
1909 establishments in Oregon
School buildings completed in 1909